Alan Taimurazovich Kasaev (born 8 April 1986) is a Russian former football player of Ossetian descent who played as a left winger.

Club career
He made his Russian Premier League debut for FC Kuban Krasnodar on 14 March 2009 in a game against FC Rubin Kazan.

On 16 May 2014, he joined FC Lokomotiv Moscow.

He spent the first half of the 2018–19 season on loan at FC Baltika Kaliningrad before his loan was terminated on 25 January 2019. On 28 January 2019, he joined Sochi on loan for the remainder of the season. He left Lokomotiv as his contract expired on 30 June 2019.

Career statistics

Honours
 Rubin
 Russian Premier League (1): 2009
 Russian Cup (1): 2011-12
 Russian Super Cup (2): 2010, 2012

Lokomotiv Moscow
 Russian Premier League (1): 2017–18
Russian Cup (2): 2014–15, 2016–17

References

External links
 
 Profile on the FC Kuban Krasnodar site 
 
 

1986 births
People from Districts of Republican Subordination
Ossetian people
Ossetian footballers
Living people
Russian footballers
Association football midfielders
Russia under-21 international footballers
Russia national football B team footballers
Russian Premier League players
FC Zenit Saint Petersburg players
FC Shinnik Yaroslavl players
FC Spartak Vladikavkaz players
FC Kuban Krasnodar players
FC Rubin Kazan players
FC Dynamo Moscow players
FC Lokomotiv Moscow players
FC Baltika Kaliningrad players
PFC Sochi players
FC Avangard Kursk players